Jacquin is a surname. Notable people with the surname include:
 Abel Jacquin (1893–1968), French film actor
 Alfonso Jacquin (1953–1985), Colombian guerilla fighter
 François Xavier Joseph Jacquin (1756–1826), Flemish painter 
 Joseph Franz von Jacquin (1766–1839), Austrian scientist, son of Nikolaus
 Lisa Ann Jacquin (born 1962), American equestrian
 Nikolaus Joseph von Jacquin (1727–1817), scientist, particularly in botany
 Philippe Jacquin (1942–2002), French anthropologist

See also
 Jacquin Jansen (born 1986), South African rugby union player